McNary may refer to:

People
 McNary (surname)

Places
In the United States:
 McNary, Arizona
 McNary, Kentucky
 McNary, Louisiana
 McNary, Oregon
 McNary, Texas

Other uses
 McNary Dam, a dam structure built across the Columbia River
 McNary Field, a public airport in Salem, Oregon
 McNary ARNG Field Heliport
 McNary High School, a high school in Keizer, Oregon